Pavel Gorbach (born 13 March 2000) is a Belarusian footballer who plays for Smorgon.

References

External links

2000 births
Living people
Belarusian footballers
Association football forwards
FC Minsk players
FC Smorgon players